Chlorocarpa is a genus of flowering plants belonging to the family Achariaceae.

Its native range is Sri Lanka.

Species:
 Chlorocarpa pentaschista Alston

References

Achariaceae
Malpighiales genera